Paul Richard Miller (born 11 October 1959) is an English former footballer who played in the Football League for Tottenham Hotspur, Charlton Athletic, Watford, Bournemouth, Brentford and Swansea City. Miller's favoured position was centre back.

Miller was born in Stepney, London. In his early years, he played his youth football in the London Borough of Hackney for the ELY (East London Youth) team, winning a league runners-up medal in 1970 at under-11 level. Miller began his professional career at Tottenham Hotspur, signing as apprentice in 1976, professional a year later, and spending a season with Skeid in the Norwegian League to gain experience. He was part of Spurs' FA Cup winning team in 1981, conceding a penalty after bringing down Dave Bennett in the replay which Tottenham won 3–2. He won a second FA Cup-winner's medal with Spurs the following year, and played a key role in their 1983–84 UEFA Cup victory, scoring an away goal in the first leg of the final against Anderlecht. He later played for Charlton Athletic, Watford, A.F.C. Bournemouth, Brentford and Swansea City.

Honours
Tottenham Hotspur
 FA Cup 1980–81, 1981–82
 FA Charity Shield: 1981 (shared) 
 UEFA Cup 1983–84

References

External links
 League stats at Neil Brown's site
  Miller's Tottenham stats and photo at Sporting Heroes

1959 births
Living people
Footballers from Stepney
English footballers
Association football defenders
Tottenham Hotspur F.C. players
Charlton Athletic F.C. players
Watford F.C. players
AFC Bournemouth players
Brentford F.C. players
Swansea City A.F.C. players
English Football League players
UEFA Cup winning players
FA Cup Final players